Luis Alberto Márquez Quezada (born 10 February 1995) is a Mexican professional footballer who plays as an attacking midfielder.

Club career

Youth
Márquez joined Guadalajara's youth academy in 2009. He then continued through Chivas Youth Academy successfully going through U-15,U-17 and U-20. Until being loaned to Coras and was finally giving the chance to play in a more competitive league rather than staying in the youth categories.

C.D. Guadalajara
Márquez was formed in C.D. Guadalajara's youth academy. He is the cousin of former Barcelona player Rafael Márquez, whom was formed in C.D. Guadalajara's hometown rival, Club Atlas.

Loan at Coras
In December 2016, it was announced Márquez was sent out on loan to Ascenso MX club Coras F.C. in order to gain professional playing experience. He made his debut as a starter in a match against U. de G. on 11 January 2017.

Loan at Zacatepec
In summer 2017, it was announced Márquez was sent out on loan to Ascenso MX club Zacatepec. He scored 2 goals against Tigres UANL to help eliminate them from the Copa MX.

Loan at Lobos BUAP
Márquez was sent out on loan to Liga MX club Lobos BUAP for the 2018 season.

International career

Mexico U-20
Márquez participated in the 2015 FIFA U-20 World Cup in New Zealand.

Honours
Tepatitlán
Liga de Expansión MX: Guardianes 2021
Campeón de Campeones: 2021

References

External links
 
 

1995 births
Living people
Mexico under-20 international footballers
C.D. Guadalajara footballers
Lobos BUAP footballers
Liga MX players
Ascenso MX players
Liga Premier de México players
Footballers from Guadalajara, Jalisco
Mexican footballers
Association football midfielders
C.D. Tepatitlán de Morelos players